This is a list of airports in Arizona (a U.S. state), grouped by type and sorted by location. It contains all public-use and military airports in the state. Some private-use and former airports may be included where notable, such as airports that were previously public-use, those with commercial enplanements recorded by the FAA or airports assigned an IATA airport code.

Airports

See also 

 Arizona World War II Army Airfields
 Essential Air Service
 Wikipedia:WikiProject Aviation/Airline destination lists: North America#Arizona

References 
Federal Aviation Administration (FAA):
 FAA Airport Data (Form 5010) from National Flight Data Center (NFDC), also available from AirportIQ 5010
 National Plan of Integrated Airport Systems (2017–2021), released 30 September 2016
 Passenger Boarding (Enplanement) Data for CY 2019 and 2020, released July 2017

Arizona Department of Transportation (ADOT):
 Airports Directory

Other sites used as a reference when compiling and updating this list:
 Aviation Safety Network – used to check IATA airport codes
 Great Circle Mapper: Airports in Arizona – used to check IATA and ICAO airport codes
 Abandoned & Little-Known Airfields: Arizona – used for information on former airports

 
Arizona
Airports
Airports